Macalla hyalinalis is a species of snout moth in the genus Macalla. It was described by Hans Georg Amsel in 1956 and is known from Venezuela (including Maracay, the type location).

References

Moths described in 1956
Epipaschiinae